Coryssovalva is a genus of moths belonging to the family Tortricidae.

Species
Coryssovalva cosmocosta Razowski, 1987

See also
List of Tortricidae genera

References

 , 1987, Tinea 12(Suppl): 130.
 , 2005, World Catalogue of Insects 5

External links
tortricidae.com

Euliini
Tortricidae genera